Frank Hammerschmidt is a clarinet manufacturer located in Burgau in the Bavarian district of Günzburg, Germany.  Frank Hammerschmidt is from the Hammerschmidt family which has been producing clarinets for generations.  These clarinets are well regarded by professionals.

References

External links
 Official website
 1998 Cass magazine article

Clarinet makers
Businesspeople from Bavaria
People from Günzburg (district)